Grégory Bettiol (born 30 March 1986) is a retired French footballer who played as a striker.

Career

Olympique Lyonnais
Born in Villefranche-sur-Saône, Bettiol was trained in the youth sections and player development program of Olympique Lyonnais from the age of 14. He was known by the club's followers for his prowess in the ranks of the Olympique Lyonnais' junior amateur team, playing in the CFA 2. In April 2006, it was announced by Olympique Lyonnais' president Jean-Michel Aulas that he would sign a one-year professional contract with the club alongside fellow young hope and France U-18 international Mourad Benhamida.

He had scored 16 goals in 21 appearances at the attack for his side captained by Benhamida and helped them win the second division Amateur Championship to get promoted in the CFA.

Bettiol was considered part of the young generation of promising players formed by Olympique Lyonnais who were signed by the club (sometimes before being sold to other outfits) like Jérémy Berthod, Karim Benzema, Hatem Ben Arfa, Mourad Benhamida, Bryan Bergougnoux, and Jérémy Clément.

Troyes
Bettiol was sold to Troyes AC at a fee of €330,000. He made his debut for Troyes in their 1–0 win over Guingamp coming on as a substitute. Bettiol scored his first goal on 24 August 2007 in Troyes' 2–0 win over Bastia.

Clermont Foot
On 30 January 2013, he signed a two and a half contract with Ligue 2 club Clermont Foot.

Honours
 Champion de France des réserves: 2006
 Coupe Gambardella finalist: 2005
 Champion de France 18 ans: 2005
 Trophée des Champions: 2006

References

1986 births
Living people
Sportspeople from Villefranche-sur-Saône
Association football forwards
French footballers
Olympique Lyonnais players
ES Troyes AC players
Clermont Foot players
Ligue 2 players
Footballers from Auvergne-Rhône-Alpes